In Greek mythology, Argia  or Argea  (Ancient Greek: Ἀργεία Argeia) was a daughter of King Adrastus of Argos, and of Amphithea, daughter of Pronax. She was married to Polynices, the exiled king of Thebes, and bore him three sons: Thersander, Adrastus, and Timeas.

Mythology 

When Oedipus had died at Thebes, Argia came with others to the funeral of Oedipus, her father-in-law. After their father's death, Polynices was to rule Thebes with his brother Eteocles on alternating years. Eteocles ruled the first year. When the year was over for Eteocles, Polynices demanded the rule. Eteocles refused to yield it and so Polynices sought out help from King Adrastus. Polynices begged an army from King Adrastus for recovering his father's kingdom from his brother Eteocles. King Adrastus not only gave an army but set out himself with six other leaders, since Thebes had seven gates that protected the city. The Seven against Thebes set out to battle against the army of Thebes headed by Eteocles. Polynices and Eteocles killed each other in a fight among themselves in the ensuing battle.

Argia set out with others to find her beloved husband among the many lying rotting in the battlefield, in spite of a decree by King Creon forbidding such, on pain of capital punishment. She searched until she found him. Argia tried to revive him with kisses and tears, however all her efforts were in vain. She then had his body cremated and placed the ashes in an urn. Her virtuous acts showed the genuine love she had for her husband.

Middle Age tradition 
She is remembered in De Mulieribus Claris, a collection of biographies of historical and mythological women by the Florentine author Giovanni Boccaccio, composed in 136162. It is notable as the first collection devoted exclusively to biographies of women in Western literature.

See also

Phoenician Women
Hyginus, who in his Fabulae (Latin) calls her Argia.
Robert Graves in his popular The Greek Myths (106c) prefers the spelling Aegeia.
Euripides in The Phoenician Women and Suppliants, who mentions the wedding without giving her name.

Notes

References 
Apollodorus, The Library with an English Translation by Sir James George Frazer, F.B.A., F.R.S. in 2 Volumes, Cambridge, MA, Harvard University Press; London, William Heinemann Ltd. 1921. ISBN 0-674-99135-4. Online version at the Perseus Digital Library. Greek text available from the same website.
Gaius Julius Hyginus, Fabulae from The Myths of Hyginus translated and edited by Mary Grant. University of Kansas Publications in Humanistic Studies. Online version at the Topos Text Project.
Hesiod, Catalogue of Women from Homeric Hymns, Epic Cycle, Homerica translated by Evelyn-White, H G. Loeb Classical Library Volume 57. London: William Heinemann, 1914. Online version at theio.com
Pausanias, Description of Greece with an English Translation by W.H.S. Jones, Litt.D., and H.A. Ormerod, M.A., in 4 Volumes. Cambridge, MA, Harvard University Press; London, William Heinemann Ltd. 1918. . Online version at the Perseus Digital Library
Pausanias, Graeciae Descriptio. 3 vols. Leipzig, Teubner. 1903.  Greek text available at the Perseus Digital Library.
Publius Papinius Statius, The Thebaid translated by John Henry Mozley. Loeb Classical Library Volumes. Cambridge, MA, Harvard University Press; London, William Heinemann Ltd. 1928. Online version at the Topos Text Project.
Publius Papinius Statius, The Thebaid. Vol I-II. John Henry Mozley. London: William Heinemann; New York: G.P. Putnam's Sons. 1928. Latin text available at the Perseus Digital Library.
Statius, Thebais IV.187–213

Princesses in Greek mythology
Argive characters in Greek mythology